Wofford may refer to:

People with the surname
Toni Morrison (born Chloe Ardelia Wofford, 1931–2019), American writer 
Dan Wofford, American politician
Harris Wofford (1926–2019), U.S. Senator from Pennsylvania, 1991-1995
James C. Wofford (born 1944), American equestrian
John Wofford (1931–2021), American equestrian
John W. Wofford (politician) (1837–1907), Missouri judge and Georgia politician
John William Wofford (1898–1955), American equestrian
Mike Wofford (born 1938), jazz pianist
Norma-Jean Wofford (c. 1942–2005), American guitarist
Thomas A. Wofford (1908–1978), United States Senator from South Carolina
William T. Wofford (1824–1884), U.S. military officer

Places

United States
Wofford Heights, California, census-designated place
Wofford, Kentucky, unincorporated community
Wofford College, Spartanburg, South Carolina